The third season of the American crime drama series The Sopranos began airing on HBO with a two-hour premiere on March 4, 2001, before concluding on May 20, 2001, and consisted of thirteen episodes. The third season was released on DVD in region 1 on August 27, 2002.

The story of season three focuses on the relationship between Tony and his children — Meadow, as she begins her first year at Columbia University, and Anthony Jr., who is having behavioral troubles in high school. Tony's relationship with his aging mother, Livia, is brought to a head. Uncle Junior, released from prison, now deals with health issues.  Dr. Melfi experiences a horrifying personal trauma, but begins to make real progress in discovering the root causes of Tony's panic attacks. Also featured heavily are Christopher's rise in the mob when he becomes a made man, Jackie Aprile, Jr. joining the crime family and Tony's extramarital affair with another one of Dr. Melfi's patients, Gloria.

Cast
 James Gandolfini as Tony Soprano (13 episodes), the underboss of the DiMeo crime family, who struggles with his relationship with his children and the son of his late friend.
 Lorraine Bracco as Jennifer Melfi (12 episodes), Tony's therapist, who undergoes a trauma and is tempted to make use of her connections.
 Edie Falco as Carmela Soprano (13 episodes), Tony's wife, whose struggles with her husband's work become more severe.
 Michael Imperioli as Christopher Moltisanti (13 episodes), Tony's cousin and a DiMeo soldier who is unhappy with his new responsibilities.
 Dominic Chianese as Corrado "Junior" Soprano, Jr. (8 episodes), Tony's uncle and the boss of the family, who is still stuck on house arrest.
 Steven Van Zandt as Silvio Dante (12 episodes), the family's loyal consigliere.
 Tony Sirico as Paul "Paulie Walnuts" Gualtieri (12 episodes), a short-tempered capo who begins having issues with Chris.
 Robert Iler as Anthony Soprano, Jr. (11 episodes), Tony's son, whose disciplinary issues become more and more severe.
 Jamie-Lynn Sigler as Meadow Soprano (13 episodes), Tony's daughter, whose choice of boyfriends puts her at odds with her father.
 Nancy Marchand as Livia Soprano (1 episode; archive footage through digital effects), Tony's petulant mother, who may testify against him in court.
 Drea de Matteo as Adriana La Cerva (9 episodes), Chris's fiancée. 
 Aida Turturro as Janice Soprano (8 episodes), Tony's dramatic sister who gets into a feud with her mother's caretaker.
 John Ventimiglia as Artie Bucco (7 episodes), Tony's non-mob friend who runs a restaurant.
 Steven R. Schirripa as Bobby Baccalieri (8 episodes), Junior's kind-hearted aide.
 Federico Castelluccio as Furio Giunta (10 episodes), a soldier under Tony.
 Robert Funaro as Eugene Pontecorvo (7 episodes), a DiMeo soldier.
 Kathrine Narducci as Charmaine Bucco (4 episodes), Artie's moral wife.
 Joe Pantoliano as Ralph Cifaretto (9 episodes), a volatile, crude soldier with ambitions that clash with Tony.

Episodes

Notes

Reception

Reviews
The third season of The Sopranos received widespread critical acclaim, garnering a score of 97 out of 100 on Metacritic. Caryn James of The New York Times cited the show as a pop-culture phenomenon and stated, "Even measured against insanely high expectations, the series is as good as it has ever been." The Los Angeles Times lauded the series as the "elitist of the elite," adding: "...The Sopranos resurfaces once more as a superbly written and executed hybrid of popular entertainment and high art, offering up its own Golden Age of TV." Detroit Free Press commended the series creator, David Chase, and singled out the show's writing and acting for praise: "The Sopranos, even as series creator David Chase changes pace this season from power struggles to family matters, is still as good as television gets: wonderfully written, superbly acted, always unpredictable."

Awards and nominations
53rd Primetime Emmy Awards
Nomination for Outstanding Drama Series
Award for Outstanding Lead Actor in a Drama Series (James Gandolfini) (Episode: "Amour Fou")
Nomination for Outstanding Lead Actress in a Drama Series (Lorraine Bracco) (Episode: "Employee of the Month")
Award for Outstanding Lead Actress in a Drama Series (Edie Falco) (Episode: "Second Opinion")
Nomination for Outstanding Supporting Actor in a Drama Series (Dominic Chianese) (Episodes: "Another Toothpick" + "Second Opinion")
Nomination for Outstanding Supporting Actor in a Drama Series (Michael Imperioli) (Episodes: "Fortunate Son" + "Pine Barrens")
Nomination for Outstanding Supporting Actress in a Drama Series (Aida Turturro) (Episodes: "Proshai, Livushka" + "Employee of the Month")
Nomination for Outstanding Guest Actress in a Drama Series (Annabella Sciorra) (Episode: "Amour Fou")
Nomination for Outstanding Directing for a Drama Series (Steve Buscemi) (Episode: "Pine Barrens")
Nomination for Outstanding Directing for a Drama Series (Allen Coulter) (Episode: "University")
Nomination for Outstanding Directing for a Drama Series (Timothy Van Patten) (Episode: "Amour Fou")
Award for Outstanding Writing for a Drama Series (Robin Green, Mitchell Burgess) (Episode: "Employee of the Month")
Nomination for Outstanding Writing for a Drama Series (Lawrence Konner) (Episode: "Second Opinion")
Nomination for Outstanding Writing for a Drama Series (Frank Renzulli, David Chase) (Episode: "Amour Fou")
Nomination for Outstanding Writing for a Drama Series (Terrence Winter, Timothy Van Patten) (Episode: "Pine Barrens")

8th Screen Actors Guild Awards
Nomination for Outstanding Performance by an Ensemble in a Drama Series (Entire Cast)
Nomination for Outstanding Performance by a Male Actor in a Drama Series (James Gandolfini)
Nomination for Outstanding Performance by a Female Actor in a Drama Series (Lorraine Bracco)
Nomination for Outstanding Performance by a Female Actor in a Drama Series (Edie Falco)

59th Golden Globe Awards
Nomination for Best Drama Series
Nomination for Best Actor in a Drama Series (James Gandolfini)
Nomination for Best Actress in a Drama Series (Lorraine Bracco)
Nomination for Best Actress in a Drama Series (Edie Falco)

6th Golden Satellite Awards
Nomination for Best Drama Series
Nomination for Best Actor in a Drama Series (James Gandolfini)
Award for Best Actress in a Drama Series (Edie Falco)

Writers Guild of America Awards 2001
Nomination for Best Drama Episode (David Chase) (Episode: "Proshai, Livushka")
Nomination for Best Drama Episode (Mitchell Burgess, Robin Green) (Episode: "Employee of the Month")
Award for Best Drama Episode (Timothy Van Patten, Terrence Winter) (Episode: "Pine Barrens")

Directors Guild of America Awards
Nomination for Outstanding Directing for a Drama Series (Steve Buscemi) (Episode: "Pine Barrens")

17th TCA Awards
Award for Program of the Year
Award for Outstanding Achievement in Drama (Tied with The West Wing)
Nomination for Outstanding Individual Achievement in Drama (Edie Falco)
Award for Outstanding Individual Achievement in Drama (James Gandolfini)

References

External links 
 
 

Season 3
2001 American television seasons